Bannigan is a surname. Notable people with the surname include:

 Eugene F. Bannigan (1911–1958), American lawyer and politician
 Stuart Bannigan (born 1992), Scottish footballer

See also
 Hannigan